Éditions Underbahn is an American publishing house created in 2005 and specialized in French-language neoconservative texts.

Fiction 
 Le Désespéré, Léon Bloy, preface by Maurice G. Dantec 
 September 11 Wall Street Sonnets and Other New York City Poems, Eugene Schlanger The Wall Street Poet 
 1984, George Orwell, Vietnamese translation by Dang Phu'o'ng-Nghi, 
 Rave, Baptiste Landon

Non-fiction 
 La Bannière Étalée, Erik Svane, preface by Guy Millière ; nominated for the Best Libertarian Book of 2005 by the ALEPS (Association for Economic Freedom and Social Progress)
 France Intox, Frédéric Valandré, preface by Pierre Rigoulot 
 MO, Dang Phu'o'ng-Nghi, 
 Houdna, Guy Millière, 
 Justice : mise en examen, Frédéric Valandré,

References

External links 
 

Underbahn
Publishing companies established in 2005